Alfa Romeo 800AF is an Italian trolleybus which was produced from 1940 to 1954.

History
During the fuel shortages of World War II, Alfa Romeo explored alternatives such as electric transport and  made a new model trolleybus the 800AF. The electric generators were produced with more efficiency. It used a body from Garavini.

Technical characteristics

Transport
Constructed for the trolleybus network in Turin, Trieste and Como.

See also
 List of buses

800AF